Sir Richard Herbert Sheppard  (2 July 1910 – 18 December 1982) was an English architect.

Sheppard was born in Bristol. He was educated at Bristol Grammar School and trained as an architect at the Royal West of England Academy. During his time there, he lost the use of his legs through poliomyelitis. He was married to Lady Majorie Sheppard.

Sheppard's firm, Richard Sheppard, Robson & Partners, founded in 1958, was responsible for the design of over eighty schools, as well as buildings at Loughborough University, the University of Leicester, Brunel University, City University, the University of Durham, the University of Newcastle, Manchester Polytechnic, Imperial College, London, and Churchill College, Cambridge.

He was appointed a Commander of the Order of the British Empire (CBE) in 1964 and was knighted in 1981.

References
Dictionary of National Biography

External links 
 Profile on Royal Academy of Arts Collections

1910 births
1982 deaths
20th-century English architects
Architects from Bristol
People educated at Bristol Grammar School
Knights Bachelor
Commanders of the Order of the British Empire
Royal Academicians